Hellinsia mollis is a moth of the family Pterophoridae. It is found in Guatemala, Costa Rica, Mexico (Querétaro) and Panama.

The wingspan is 16–17 mm. The antennae are bone-white, the head and thorax are whitish ochreous. The forewings are bone-white, overlaid with whitish ochreous, becoming more strongly ochreous along the fold, before the fissure, and beneath the costa to the apex. The hindwings are shining, bone-whitish. Adults are on wing in May and June.

References

Moths described in 1915
mollis
Moths of Central America
Moths of North America